Tanymykter is an extinct genus of camelid, endemic to North America. Fossils have been found from Wyoming and Nebraska to Santa Barbara County, California.

References

Prehistoric camelids
Miocene even-toed ungulates
Miocene mammals of North America
Prehistoric even-toed ungulate genera